A perron (in French; also ) is kind of stone column, often decorated with a cross-bearing orb (globus cruciger) common to many towns and cities belonging to the erstwhile Prince-Bishopric of Liège (980-1795) in modern-day Belgium. They were primarily built in the so-called Good Cities (Bonnes Villes or Goede Steden) that formed the primary urban settlements in the polity. Many survive, although not in their original form. Perrons were also built in the smaller Principality of Stavelot-Malmedy.

The columns came to symbolise civic freedom and autonomy (initially bishopric autonomy, later urban autonomy). This stemmed from their function as places where laws were proclaimed and justice was administered. However, the actual origin of the symbols of the column is unclear. In 1467, after recapturing the rebellious city of Liège, Charles the Bold, Duke of Burgundy had the city's perron dismantled and removed to Bruges, not to be returned until after his death. This was "viewed both as a punishment of the people of Liège and as a clear warning to any Flemish subjects who might be tempted to question the duke's authority".

Perrons and the Prince-Bishopric of Liege

The former cities of the Prince-Bishrophic where perrons have been built are nowadays located in multiple regions and provinces of Belgium, in addition to one in the Netherlands (that of Maastricht, which was a condominium of the Prince-Bishopric and the Duchy of Brabant during the Middle Ages).

Limburg Province (Belgium)

Liège Province (Belgium)

Limburg Province (Netherlands)

On coats of arms
A perron is featured in the coat of arms of the city of Liège and has become a badge of the city. The design is also featured on the cap badge of Belgium's 12th Regiment of the Line.

See also
Market cross, a similar monument type in Britain

References

Bibliography

Columns and entablature
Prince-Bishopric of Liège
Buildings and structures in Limburg (Netherlands)
Buildings and structures in Limburg (Belgium)
Buildings and structures in Liège Province